This is a list of notable events in Latin music (music from Spanish- and Portuguese-speaking areas of Latin America, Europe, and the United States) that took place in 2010.

Events
November 11 – The 11th Annual Latin Grammy Awards are held at the Mandalay Bay Events Center in Las Vegas, Nevada:
Mexican pop group Camila wins the Latin Grammy Award for Record of the Year for "Mientes" while Mario Domm and Monica Velez won the Latin Grammy Award for Song of the Year for the song.
A Son de Guerra by Dominican singer and songwriter Juan Luis Guerra and his group 4.40 wins the Latin Grammy Award for Album of the Year.
Alex Cuba wins Best New Artist.
Spanish tenor Plácido Domingo is honored as the Person of the Year by the Latin Recording Academy.

Number-ones albums and singles by country
List of Hot 100 number-one singles of 2010 (Brazil)
List of number-one albums of 2010 (Mexico)
List of number-one albums of 2010 (Spain)
List of number-one singles of 2010 (Spain)
List of number-one Billboard Latin Albums from the 2010s
List of number-one Billboard Top Latin Songs of 2010

Awards
2010 Premio Lo Nuestro
2010 Billboard Latin Music Awards
2010 Latin Grammy Awards
2010 Tejano Music Awards

Albums released

First quarter

January

February

March

Second quarter

April

May

June

Third quarter

July

August

September

Fourth quarter

October

November

December

Dates unknown

Best-selling records

Best-selling albums
The following is a list of the top 10 best-selling Latin albums in the United States in 2010, according to Billboard.

Best-performing songs
The following is a list of the top 10 best-performing Latin songs in the United States in 2010, according to Billboard.

Deaths

References 

 
Latin music by year